Shauna-Kay Hines (born 29 June 1989) is a Jamaican parataekwondo practitioner. She competed at the 2020 Summer Paralympics in the –58 kg category, having been the only Jamaican representative at the Paralympics competition. Hines also won a bronze medal in Taekwondo at the 2019 Parapan American Games. She was a batonbearer for the 2022 Commonwealth Games Queen's Baton Relay when the baton came to her island in April 2022.

References

External links
 

1989 births
Living people
Taekwondo practitioners at the 2020 Summer Paralympics
Medalists at the 2019 Parapan American Games
Jamaican taekwondo practitioners
21st-century Jamaican people